Xiaoqing River is a river in Shandong Province, China. It is part of the Bohai Sea basin and empties into the Bohai Sea. The river flows through the major cities of Jinan, Zibo, Binzhou, Dongying, and Weifang.

See also
List of rivers in China

Rivers of Shandong